Patrick Wessely (born 27 March 1994) is an Austrian footballer.

Career

Admira Wacker
Wessely started his career at Admira Wacker and made his professional debut on 3 August 2013 in a 7–1 defeat against SV Grödig. On 24 April 2017 the club announced that his contract won't be continued and in the summer of 2017 Wessely left the club alongside his teammate Toni Vastić.

Septemvri Sofia
On 20 October 2017 he signed a 2 years contract with the  Bulgarian First League team of Septemvri Sofia. He made his official debut for the club on 26 October 2017 in a cup match against Etar Veliko Tarnovo in which Septemvri was eliminated. He completed his debut in the league on 6 November in a 1:0 home win against Pirin Blagoevgrad.

Club statistics

References

External links
 
 Profile at Cyprus Football Association

1994 births
Living people
Footballers from Vienna
Austrian footballers
Association football defenders
Austria youth international footballers
Austria under-21 international footballers
Austrian expatriate footballers
Austrian expatriate sportspeople in Bulgaria
Expatriate footballers in Bulgaria
Expatriate footballers in Belarus
Expatriate footballers in Cyprus
Austrian Football Bundesliga players
Austrian Regionalliga players
First Professional Football League (Bulgaria) players
Cypriot Second Division players
FC Admira Wacker Mödling players
FC Septemvri Sofia players
SKN St. Pölten players
FC Neman Grodno players
P.O. Xylotymbou players
Austrian expatriate sportspeople in Cyprus